Iftikhar Qaisar (born 2 May) is a British Pakistani journalist, poet, broadcaster, travel writer and film maker. Known among his peers and fellows as a fearless, humble and thorough professional.

Besides his numerous professional accolades he is known as an adventure traveler as he enjoys riding his Harley Davidson motorbike for thousands of miles during summer vacations. He was the editor of the London-based, largest circulated, Urdu newspapers Daily Jang and The News International. In tandem to his positions at the newspapers he was Bureau Chief of Geo News for the UK and Europe.

Early life

Family 
Iftikhar Qaisar was born in the Sufi poet Baba Farid’s town of Pakpattan in Sahiwal District, Pakistan which was also his mother’s town. Although being born in Pakputtan he grew up and studied in another Sufi poet’s (Khawaja Ajmair Chishti) Chishtian Manddi. This is where his father and whole ‘tribe’ emigrated to during partition from Jalandhar, India. Jalandhar was known as a district to produce poets, writers and singers.

Pakistan was created only eleven years before Iftikhar Qaisar was born so he remembers growing up surrounded by immigrants sobbing of home sickness for Jalandhar, India. They used to say they were cheated by authorities on both sides to move to Pakistan. He recalls how they missed their happy lives in India and their Hindu and Sikh friends who were also their cherished neighbours. They appreciated the multi-cultural and multi-religious Indian society that they were no longer part of. The immigrants used to say they were told by the authorities that their move to Pakistan was only temporary and they would be allowed to move back once the racist attacks stopped. Many of them left the majority of their belongings behind in India as they thought they would return one day.

He recalls how all of those Indian muslim immigrants recollected that the British Raj was the best ruling era in India - ‘the British justice system was a lot better than Indian and Pakistani’s direct rule for the common Indian and Pakistani people’.

Iftikhar Qaisar's mother's ‘tribe’ were also Indian immigrants who were moved from Hoshiarpur India to Pakputtan Pakistan - they held the same view/feelings as his father's 'tribe'.

His mother's father served in the British army and was kept as a prisoner of war in a Japanese prison camp during the Second World War. Iftikhar's mother grew up living with her family in the British army's cantonment in Ferozepur India next door to the white British army servicemen's families. She used to tell stories to her children about living next to the educated white British ladies and their children, and their great lifestyles and living standards, noting how civilised they were. She learned her knitting and sewing skills through the white British ladies.

Iftikhar Qaisar imagines, that during his childhood his mother's stories about English culture may have touched and inspired him with a curiosity to western culture. When he moved to the UK in 1983 one of the first things he did was to learn ballroom dancing - he competed in a number of amateur competitions.

Education and poetry 
He remembered hating the Pakistani education system as a child and so spent most of his time at the only local library in his town rather than at school. This is where he got inspired by Urdu literature, politics and poetry. He started to write his poetry in school and was encouraged by his tutor Abdul Hamid Shakeb who was himself a poet and writer.

From a young age his poems were published in the children's section of newspapers such as ‘Daily Imrrose’. He became the editor of his college's magazine and was elected Secretary General of his college's (Government Degree College Chishtian Manddi) literary society. He was also appointed Poetry Representative for his college and won several student poetry competitions all over the country.

Politics 
In 1981 in his home town he joined a political party called ‘Mazdoor Kosan Party’ (Labourer and Farmers Party) which was at the time led by the renowned communist leader Major Ishaq and the student's communist leader Imtiaz Allam. He soon left the party to join Benazir Bhutto’s father’s party Zulfiqar Ali Bhutto’s ‘Peoples Party’ which was a little version of a socialist party. On starting his full-time career as a professional journalist he completely gave up all his memberships and affiliations with all political parties.

Career
Having worked in London for the same Jang media group for the best part of 31 years he had the opportunity of working in almost every different section from subbing, reporting, editing to an interview specialist - ending his career in October 2015. As a reporter he was endangered covering the Kosovo war when several gunmen opened fire on a refugee camp he was making a report on.

In 1981, at the beginning of his journalistic career, he was detained by martial law army authorities for breaking news to international media about a cholera outbreak in his home town of Chishtian Maandi Pakistan during a media blackout. Over 40 people died and hundreds were severely unwell. The reported story took international attention and as a result help soon arrived.

Jang Forum
Iftikhar Qaisar started Jang Forum in the London bureau of the Daily Jang with the help of the organisation's local CEO Ashraf K Kazi in 1991. At the time the Daily Jang newspaper was the only ethnic media in the UK. There were no other regular ethnic newspapers, radio stations or TV Channels in the UK. It was an audience based weekly programme similar to BBC's Question Time.

The transcript of every Jang Forum was published with a full page or dual page spread in the Daily Jang. It covered important community issues and brought Indian and Pakistani celebrities face to face with a public audience. Audience participation was encouraged and people were able to ask direct questions to the special guests. The popularity of Jang Forum grew at speed from its beginning.

Celebrities included Dilip Kumar, Ustad Nusrat Fateh Ali Khan, Madam Noor Jahan, Benazir Bhutto, Imran Khan, Kumar Sanu, Noshad, Alka Yagnik, Shabnum, Tony Benn MP, Wali Khan, Maulana Abdul Sattar Edhi, Maulana Shah Ahmed Noorani, Maulana Abdul Sattar Niazi, Qazi Hussain Ahmed, Altaf Hussain, Ahmed Faraz, Saqi Farooqi, Iftikhar Arif, Gopi Chand Narang, Keith Vaz MP, Sir Anwar Pervez, Gulam Noon MBE and General Aslam Baig.

When Geo TV was launched in 2001 Jang Forum was rebranded as ‘Awaaz’ and launched as a TV Show. After a small gap the programme was once again rebranded and went back to its original name of ‘Jang Forum’. This time, although still based in London, ‘Jang Forum’ travelled the UK and Europe with its production team and met local audiences. Some of the highlights of their travels included Brussels, Barcelona, Amsterdam, Rochdale Glasgow, Manchester, Peterborough, Luton and Birmingham.

The latest series included the following guests Hamid Mir, Najam Sethi, Iftikhar Chaudhry, Chaudhry Muhammad Sarwar, Yousuf Raza Gilani, Barrister Sultan Mehmood, Shahbaz Sharif, Baroness Sayeeda Warsi, Malik Riaz, Sadiq Khan MP, Khalid Mehmood MP, Yasmin Qureshi MP, Naz Shah MP, Imran Hussain MP, Rehman Chishti MP, Anas Sarwar MP, Sheikh Rasheed, Asma Jahangir, Iftikhar Arif, Sajjad Karim, Amjad Bashir, Mohammad Ajib and Lord Tariq Ahmad.

Film

In 1981 Iftikhar Qaisar trained as a motion film director in Evernew Studios Lahore Pakistan. He worked as an assistant director to several directors but mainly with the actor, writer and director Rangeela. He also spent time assisting film writers in Pakistan.

When he moved to London in 1983 he was selected for sponsorship by a Mayor of London's office campaign to join a special film direction course in the world-famous National Film School in Beaconsfield. He then continued to complete a number of TV Production courses at Goldsmiths College London.

He produced his first 13 episode Urdu TV Drama serial ‘Muhabatain’ in London in 1999 which aired on PTV (Pakistan Television).

He also produced and directed a documentary on Ustad Nusrat Fateh Ali Khan’s life.

In 2001 he established IQ Studios in Pakistan. This TV studio produced the longest running TV Soap on Pakistani television which was called Tere Pehloo Main. The company has since produced hundreds of hours of TV programming including dramas, documentaries and shows. It has also trained hundreds of technicians whilst creating a large number of jobs in Pakistan.

Poetry
As a well known and established young poet he was able to make a living from his poetry recitals when he came to the UK in 1983. His first poetry reading was in SOAS (School of Oriental and African Studies) London University which was organised by Urdu Markaz. It was attended by hundreds of people including Pakistani political exiles and literature critics. The audience was stunned by the quality and the freshness of his poetry (as reported in local newspaper at the time). As a result of this first public display his fame as a young poet shifted from Pakistan to the UK overnight.

Poetry readings soon began to take up the majority of his time in London as he actively participated in dozens during his formative time in the UK. When Benazir Bhutto was forced as a political exile to London Iftikhar Qaisar was requested to read his popular and patriotic poetry at her massive public rallies.

His first poetry book Samander Maen Samander was first published in 1991 by Alhamd Publications (Lahore, Pakistan) - several editions followed.

At the height of activity in his poetic life during the eighties and early nineties many great Urdu and Punjabi poets appreciated his poetry in their interviews and writing. The great poets and critics who spoke and wrote in favour of his poetry include Ahmed Nadeem Qasmi, Ahmed Faraz, Habib Jalib, Mushfiq Khwaja, Gopi Chand Narang, Zia Jalandhari, Saqi Farooqi, Iftikhar Arif, Shohrat Bukhari, Farigh Bukhari and Baqir Naqvi.

During the same period his poetry was published in a number of top Pakistani and Indian literary publications such as Fanoon, Naqoosh, Adb-e-Latif and Rakhta.

Music
Several of his most famous poems (Ghazals) have been sung by top Pakistani and Indian singers like Ustad Nusrat Fateh Ali Khan, Rahat Ali Khan, Maqbool Sabri, Hadiqa Kiani, Pervez Mehdi, Shabnum Majid, Humera Arshad, Mehtab Malhotra and Ghulam Ali.

In 1997 a music album of Iftikhar Qaisar's poetry was released under the same title as his first book ‘Samander Maen Samander’. The album was compiled and directed by Ustad Nusrat Fateh Ali Khan. This was in fact Khan's last album before his tragic death in London. A music video was made for the title song ‘Samander Maen Samander’ which helped the popularity of the album worldwide. The music video has been shown on several Indian and Pakistani channels as well as being uploaded to YouTube by many fans.

References

British broadcasters
British journalists
British people of Pakistani descent
20th-century British poets
Pakistani writers
British male poets
Year of birth missing (living people)
Living people
20th-century British male writers